Stóravatn is a lake in Sandoy, Faroe Islands. The lake is located just south of the village of Sandur, which is located on the east coast of Sandoy. The lake is 0.15 km2  and is among the 10 largest lakes in the Faroe Islands.

References 

Lakes of the Faroe Islands
Sandoy